Tore Janson (born 1936) is a Swedish linguist. Janson was professor of Latin at the University of Gothenburg, and later became professor of African languages at the same alma mater. He retired in 2001, but has since been affiliated with the University of Stockholm.

He devoted much of his time and publishing activities to the way languages change as well as the relationship between language and society.

He is the author of the international bestsellers Speak: A Short History of Languages and A Natural History of Latin.

Works 
English
 Speak: A Short History of Languages, Oxford: Oxford University Press, 2002. 
 A Natural History of Latin, Oxford: Oxford University Press 2004. 
 The History of Languages: An Introduction, Oxford: Oxford University Press, 2012. 

Swedish
 Latin Kulturen, historien, språket, Wahlström & Widstrand, 2002 
 Språken och historien (transl. language and history), Stockholm: Norstedts, 2008. 
 Språkens historia. En upptäcktsresa i tid och rum (transl. Language's history, a discovery journey across time and space), Stockholm: Norstedts, 2010. 
 Germanerna, Stockholm: Norstedts, 2013.

References

External links
 Profile at Stockholm University
 Author profile at Norstedts publishers

1936 births
Living people
Linguists from Sweden
Academic staff of the University of Gothenburg